Lindsay Park may refer to:

Lindsay Park (Davenport, Iowa)
Lindsay Park (housing cooperative), Brooklyn, New York
Lindsay Park Elementary School of School District 6 Rocky Mountain, British Columbia
MNP Community & Sport Centre, Calgary, Alberta, formerly known as Lindsay Park Sports Centre
Lindsay Hansen Park, acting director for the Salt Lake City non-profit Sunstone